Bly is an unincorporated small town in Klamath County, Oregon, United States. , the population was 207.

Geography
Bly is in southeastern Klamath County, slightly west of Lake County, along  Oregon Route 140.

Fish Hole Creek, which flows through the community, meets the South Fork Sprague River slightly north of Bly. Fremont National Forest surrounds Bly except on the northwest.

Climate
This region experiences warm (but not hot) and dry summers, with no average monthly temperatures above .  According to the Köppen Climate Classification system, Bly has a warm-summer Mediterranean climate, abbreviated "Csb" on climate maps.

History 
The name Bly comes from the Klamath word p'lai, meaning 'up' or 'high', referring to its location at the upper Sprague River.  The Sprague River post office was established in the area in 1873, and the name was changed to Bly in 1883. At that time, the community was near the east end of the Klamath Indian Reservation. The 21st century community of Sprague River is downstream and west of Bly and Beatty.

Around 1900, Bly had two general stores, two hotels, and a saloon. A history published in 1905 referred to the surrounding area as the "precinct" or the "valley" and estimated its total population at 750. The chief products of the valley at that time included cattle, horses, mules, and a few sheep, as well as oats, clover, and hay.

In 1935, the United States Forest Service acquired a  site in Bly for a district ranger station to manage the western part of the Fremont National Forest.  The Forest Service paid $625 for the property.  The ranger station was built by Civilian Conservation Corps workers under the supervision of Forest Service district ranger Perry Smith.  The seven original buildings at the Bly Ranger Station were constructed between 1936 and 1942. A modern administrative headquarters building was added to the compound in the 1960s. The ranger station compound was listed on the National Register of Historic Places in 1981.

World War II
Bly is also the site of the only fatalities of World War II in the continental U.S. due to an enemy balloon bomb attack. On May 5, 1945, a Japanese balloon bomb exploded as it was being pulled from the woods by curious picnickers.  Killed in the explosion were:  Elsie Mitchell, 26, wife of minister Archie E. Mitchell; Edward Engen, 13; Richard Patzke, 14; Jay Gifford, 13; Sherman Shoemaker, 11; and Joan Patzke, 13. Rev. Mitchell heard the explosion and discovered the bodies. The victims' families were compensated by the government. A memorial was erected at what today is called the Mitchell Recreation Area.

Parks and recreation
The OC&E Woods Line State Trail, the longest linear state park in Oregon, passes through Bly. The  rail trail was built on the roadbeds of the former Oregon, California and Eastern Railway, which ran from Klamath Falls to Bly, and a former spur line, the Woods Line.

References

Unincorporated communities in Klamath County, Oregon
1873 establishments in Oregon
Populated places established in 1873
Unincorporated communities in Oregon